The Nilgiri-class frigates, formally classified as the Project-17 Alpha frigates (P-17A), are a series of stealth guided-missile frigates currently being built by Mazagon Dock Shipbuilders (MDL) and Garden Reach Shipbuilders & Engineers (GRSE), for the Indian Navy.

Design

Development

The frigates were designed by the Warship Design Bureau ( formerly Directorate of Naval Design ) – an internal establishment within the Indian Navy responsible for designing warships; the organisation is also distinguished for having contributed to the designing of numerous Indian warships, including  – India's first indigenously-designed aircraft carrier, the s – India's first indigenously-designed nuclear-powered ballistic missile submarines and the s – India's first indigenously designed frigates equipped with stealth technology.

The class' design was finalised by the DND in 2013; it was later unveiled to the public in April 2018 – when MDL displayed a scale model of the frigate at the "DEXEXPO 2018" defense exhibition, held at Chennai, Tamil Nadu, India.

Features

Stealth
The frigate's design incorporates a significant degree of stealth and low radar-observability – through the utility of composite materials, radar-absorbent coatings and low-observable/radar-transparent technologies; the usage of the aforementioned materials assists the vessel in maintaining a low radar cross-section (RCS).

The vessel's physical profile also features a substantial level of stealth through the application of different physical forms – including an enclosed mooring deck, flush deck-mounted weapon systems and a reduced number of antennae.

The frigate's infrared signature, most specifically emissions from its propulsion exhaust and power generation machinery, are reduced through the application of Venturi effect and fluid injection, which helps to reduce the plume and hot metal temperatures of exhaust. To maintain acoustic silence, the frigate is equipped with propellers designed to have onset of cavitation at higher speeds to reduce hydrodynamic noise. In addition to the propellers, the vessel's hull also features special acoustic enclosures for some of the machinery to reduce the emission air-borne noise.

Modular profile
The P-17A frigates are the first major class of Indian-designed warships to be built using the methodology of integrated modular construction – a manufacturing process in which multiple modules (or "blocks") of a vessel's hull are pre-assembled/pre-outfitted independently, before being aggregated for final assembly.

In December 2015, MDL contracted Fincantieri S.p.A. to provide technical assistance and essential expertise in the construction of the seven frigates using the "modular construction" methodology.

Naming 
The seventh and final vessel of the P-17A series, which did not have a namesake from the older class, was given the new name of Mahendragiri.

Instrumentation

Armament

Anti-surface warfare

As part of its anti-surface warfare (ASuW) capabilities, the class features eight BrahMos anti-ship cruise missiles, capable of speeds of up to Mach 3. The BrahMos is widely regarded as one of the most formidable anti-ship missiles currently in service, given the missile's extreme versatility and manoeuvrability.

The vessels are equipped with one OTO Melara 76 mm naval gun. Originally, the Indian Navy had planned to install the Mk 45  naval gun, manufactured by BAE; however, this plan was later scrapped in 2021 on account of financial constraints.

Anti-air warfare
As part of its anti-air warfare (AAW) capabilities, the class features thirty-two Barak 8ER surface-to-air missiles, with sixteen missiles present in four "2 x 4" VLS configurations – with two placed at the bow and two placed aft.

Anti-submarine warfare
As part of its anti-submarine warfare (ASW) capabilities, the class features two triple-tube lightweight torpedo launchers for firing ASW torpedoes.

Decoys
During the class' unveiling in 2018, the frigate's design was noted to possess two anti-torpedo decoy systems and four decoy launchers – which presumably may be the NSTL Maareech torpedo-countermeasure system and the Kavach anti-missile decoy launchers, respectively.

Aviation facilities
As part of its aviation facilities, the class is equipped with a flight-deck and an enclosed aviation hangar, capable of accommodating a single naval helicopter – most likely the ALH Dhruv MK-III maritime-reconnaissance helicopters, or the Westland Sea King Mk. 42B ASW/ASuW helicopters – both of which are operated by the Indian Naval Air Arm.

Sensors

Radar
The class features the EL/M-2248 MF-STAR active electronically scanned array (AESA) radar as its primary radar suite.

The class also features the Indra LTR-25 'Lanza' surface-search radar, as its secondary radar suite.

The frigates are also equipped with an advanced combat management system, classified as "CMS-17A", which is reportedly equipped with sophisticated data links for high, efficient interoperability with other naval vessels.

Sonar
The class is equipped with the BEL HUMSA-NG sonar, developed by the DRDO. The HUMSA-NG is a hull mounted "active cum passive" integrated sonar system capable of detecting, localizing, classifying and tracking sub-surface targets in both active and passive modes.

Electronic warfare
The frigates feature the Shakti electronic warfare (EW) suite – developed by the Defence Electronics Research Laboratory (DLRL), for defense against anti-ship missiles and for the interception, detection, classification, identification and jamming of conventional radars. Shakti is equipped with wide-band electronic-support measures (ESM), electronic countermeasures (ECM), an integrated "Radar Finger Printing System (RFPS)" and a data-recording replay feature for "post-mission analysis".

Propulsion 
At the time of the order, HAL had already delivered eleven LM2500 turbines to the Indian Navy; the turbines are specifically used on multiple Indian warships, most notably on the Shivalik-class frigates.

Each frigate features two General Electric LM2500 gas turbines – manufactured by GE Aviation and two MAN 12V28/33D STC four-stroke engines – manufactured by MAN Diesel & Turbo, arranged in a combined diesel and gas (CODAG) propulsion configuration.

In May 2016, the Indian Navy contracted MAN Diesel & Turbo to supply fourteen MAN 12V28/33D STC four-stroke engines for the seven frigates; under the deal, the requisite parts needed for the engines were sourced from India, while the engines' final assembly and testing were conducted at MAN's facility in Aurangabad, India.

In December 2016, the Indian Navy contracted GE Aviation to supply fourteen LM2500 gas turbines for the seven frigates, which were license-assembled in India by the Industrial & Marine Gas Turbine Division (IMGT) of Hindustan Aeronautics Limited (HAL). Under the deal, HAL was additionally sanctioned to provide comprehensive services – including the supply of spare parts, maintenance inspections and equipment overhauls.

In February 2019, MDL contracted GE to supply an assortment of auxiliary equipment to the Indian Navy to support the fourteen engines; under the agreement, GE also handled the design work of the frigate's auxiliary system and its fuel supply system.

History

Background

In June 2009, the Defence Acquisition Council (DAC) – the main acquisition panel subordinate to India's Ministry of Defence (MoD), cleared a proposal for the procurement of seven stealth frigates at a cost of ₹45,000 crore – classified as "Project 17A" – on the lines of the Indian Navy's initiative of establishing a 160-ship fleet.

In September 2012, the Cabinet Committee on Security (CCS) – India's top decision-making institution on matters related to defense and national security, green-lighted the proposal for the "development cum construction" of the seven frigates. Initially, the Indian Navy favoured a proposal of building the first two frigates at a foreign shipyard – seeking to minimize the project's overall construction timeline; however, this suggestion was overruled by India's Ministry of Defence (MoD) – which favoured indigenous production of the frigates.

The seven frigates were envisioned as a "follow-on series" to the Shivalik-class frigates (Project 17), which were also being built for the Indian Navy at the time, but equipped with more sophisticated capabilities. The designing-process of the seven frigates was completed in mid-2013.
The project – consisting of the construction of the seven designated frigates over a span of five years – was formally approved by the CCS in February 2015.

Construction
The seven frigates are to be jointly constructed by two public-sector shipyards, namely, Mazagon Dock Shipbuilders Limited (MDL) and Garden Reach Shipbuilders and Engineers (GRSE), with four of the frigates allotted to MDL and the remaining three allotted to GRSE.

Garden Reach Shipbuilders & Engineers

In February 2015, the Indian Navy contracted Garden Reach Shipbuilders & Engineers (GRSE), a Kolkata-based public-sector shipyard, to build three P-17A frigates at an estimated cost of ₹19,294 crore. According to the terms of the contract, GRSE is slated to deliver the three frigates in 2023, 2024 and 2025, respectively. In preparation for the order, GRSE re-augmented its infrastructure by establishing newer "modular" shipyards along with a Goliath gantry crane, meant for enabling the construction of the frigates in a short time frame.

A significant proportion of the hull's blocks needed for the vessel's construction was procured from smaller shipyards and metal fabrication shops in and around Kolkata, while the construction/fabrication of additional infrastructure was done at GRSE's Rajabagan shipyard.

The construction of the first frigate began in November 2018, while work on the second and third frigates began in January 2020 and March 2021, respectively. The first of the three frigates, Himgiri, was launched on 14 December 2020, with its delivery slated to occur for August 2023. The second frigate, Dunagiri, was launched on 15 June 2022, with its delivery slated to occur in 2024.

Mazagon Dock Shipbuilders Limited

In February 2015, the Indian Navy contracted Mazagon Dock Shipbuilders Limited (MDL), a Mumbai-based public-sector shipyard, to build four P-17A frigates at an estimated cost of over ₹21,000 crore. According to the terms of the contract, MDL is to deliver the four frigates in 2022, 2023, 2024 and 2025, respectively.

The four frigates were built at different locations, namely, at MDL's main shipbuilding facility in Mumbai, at MDL's subordinate facility in Nhava, at a smaller shipbuilding facility also operated by MDL in Mumbai, at an MSE shipyard in Gujarat and at another shipyard in Goa. Similarly to GRSE, MDL also upgraded its existing infrastructure; the shipyard augmenting its existing facilities with newer equipment, including a "Goliath" gantry crane, a module workshop, a wet basin and a "cradle assembly" shop, meant to facilitate modular construction.

The construction of the first frigate began in December 2017, while work on the second, third and fourth frigates began in May 2019, September 2020 and June 2022, respectively. The first of the four frigates, Nilgiri, was launched on 28 September 2019, with its delivery slated to occur in August 2022. The third frigate, Taragiri, was launched on 11 September 2022, and is scheduled to be delivered in 2025.

Ships in the class

See also

Frigates of comparable configurations and capabilities
 FREMM multipurpose frigate – A series of multi-purpose frigates, operated by the French Navy, the Italian Navy, the Royal Moroccan Navy, the Egyptian Navy and currently being built for the United States Navy and the Indonesian Navy.
 Type 26 frigate – A class of frigates ordered by the Royal Navy, the Royal Canadian Navy and the Royal Australian Navy.
 MKS 180 frigate – A planned class of frigates that are to be built for the German Navy.
  –  A class of multi-mission frigates currently being built for the Japan Maritime Self-Defense Force.
  – A planned class of multi-purpose frigates that are to be built for the Spanish Navy.
  – A class of guided-missile frigates operated by the Russian Navy.

Other references to the Indian Navy
Future ships of the Indian Navy
List of active Indian Navy ships

References

External links
Project 17A frigate at Bharat-rakshak.com

Frigates of the Indian Navy
Frigate classes
Proposed ships